The Château de Ganges was a castle in the commune of Ganges in the Hérault département of France. Only ruins remain.

History
The castle was the scene of a murder in the 17th century. The beautiful Dianne de Roussan was killed by her husband's brothers, who wanted her large fortune. They were caught and subsequently executed.

See also
List of castles in France

References

Ruined castles in Occitania (administrative region)
Castles in Hérault